Big Brain, is a South-Korean R&B ballad group that consist of four-members under the label World Show Market. They have been active since 2010 and officially debuted on October 22, 2015, with the album Billionaire Sound and their breakthrough song “Welcome”.

History

Pre-debut
They were group of students who majored in vocal performance and decided to form their own group. During pre-debut, they were known as The Man, but changed their name due to similarity with another senior group. Big Brain is a group that enjoys music, singing and hopes that their music will heal others. Before their official debut, many people already recognised their outstanding talent, calling them the next Brown Eyed Soul and compared them to Big Mama Before they held their official debut concert in South Korea, they were busking around New York City and performed in several places including Times Square, Central Park, and other places in Manhattan.

2015 debut, Billionaire Sound
The group debuted on October 22, 2015, with the release of their first mini-album Billionaire Sound and their digital single featuring title track "Welcome". "Welcome" is an emotional ballad mixed with powerful R&B and a fresh tempo. The story of the song is about an honest man who wishes that his ex-lover would never have a beautiful relationship with another man. They showed an impressive work which boldly challenged the youth with different genres.

2016
They became an opening act in Olivia Newton-John concert on May, 14

Members
 Sanghoon
 Jinyong
 Byeongeun
 Honghyun

Discography

Mini Album

Television

References

Musical groups from Seoul
South Korean contemporary R&B musical groups
K-pop music groups
Musical quartets
South Korean boy bands